The tale known as "The Poison Dress" or "Embalmed Alive" features a dress that has in some way been poisoned. This is a recurring theme throughout legends and folktales of various cultures, including ancient Greece, Mughal India, and the United States. Although lacking evidence suggesting that some American urban legends are directly linked to the classical tales, they share several common motifs.

Greek mythology

The poison dress motif is similar to the Shirt of Flame. In Greek mythology, when Jason left the sorceress Medea to marry Glauce, King Creon's daughter, Medea took her revenge by sending Glauce a poison dress and a golden coronet, also dipped in poison. This resulted in the death of the princess and, subsequently, the king, when he tried to save her.

The Shirt of Nessus is smeared with the poisoned blood of the centaur Nessus, which was given to Hercules by Hercules' wife, Deianira. Deianira had been tricked by Nessus and made to believe that the blood would ensure Hercules's faithfulness. According to Sophocles' tragedy The Women of Trachis, Hercules began to perspire when he put on the shirt, which soon clung to his flesh, corroding it. He eventually threw himself onto a pyre on Mount Oeta in extreme agony and burned to death.

Indian folklore

Numerous tales of poison khilats (robes of honour) have been recorded in historical, folkloric, and medical texts of British Indianists. Gifts of clothing were common in major life-cycle rituals in pre-industrial India and these stories revolve around fears of betrayal, inspired by ancient custom of giving khilats to friends and enemies as demonstrations of a social relationship or a political alliance.

In 1870, Norman Chevers, M.D., a Surgeon-Major to the Bengal Medical Service, authored Manual of Medical Jurisprudence for India, describing unusual crimes involving poisons native to India. The book included three cases of poison khilat death, attributing the cause of one of the deaths to lethal vesicants impregnating the fabric of the robe and entering the victim's sweat pores.

American urban legends
The theme of the poison dress appears in several American urban legends, which were recorded in folklore collections and journal articles in the 1940s and 1950s. Folklorist Stith Thompson noted the classical prototype in these stories, "Shirt of Nessus", and assigned Motif D1402.5, "Magic shirt burns wearer up". Jan Harold Brunvand provides the summary of one of the stories:

Folklorist Ernest Baughman speculated that the story might have been used as adverse publicity to discredit a well-known store, since several variants of the story specifically mention the name of the store at which the dress was supposedly purchased. The legend continued to be told long after its initial popularity, with "embalming fluid" sometimes replacing the formaldehyde mentioned in the earlier version. This urban legend was dramatized in the episode "'Til Death Do We Part" from the crime-scene drama CSI: NY.

Also contributing to the poison-dress theme is the prevalence of smallpox-contaminated blankets, which were given to Native Americans. Well-documented examples include the tainted blankets gifted to Indians at Fort Pitt in 1763.

References

Dresses
Recurring elements in folklore
Urban legends